Silver-gilt or gilded/gilt silver, sometimes known in American English by the French term vermeil, is silver (either pure or sterling) which has been gilded with gold. Most large objects made in goldsmithing that appear to be gold are actually silver-gilt; for example most sporting trophies (including medals such as the gold medals awarded in all Olympic Games after 1912) and many crown jewels are silver-gilt objects.

Apart from the raw materials being much less expensive to acquire than solid gold of any karat, large silver-gilt objects are also noticeably lighter if lifted, as well as more durable (gold is much heavier than even lead and is easily scratched and bent). For objects that have intricate detail like monstrances, gilding greatly reduces the need for cleaning and polishing, and so reduces the risk of damage. Ungilded silver would suffer oxidation and need frequent polishing; gold does not oxidize at all.  The "gold" threads used in embroidered goldwork are normally also silver-gilt.

Techniques

Silver-gilt objects have been made since ancient times across Eurasia, using a variety of gilding techniques, and a distinctive depletion gilding technique was developed by the Incas in Pre-Columbian South America.  "Overlaying" or folding or hammering on gold foil or gold leaf is mentioned in Homer's Odyssey (Bk vi, 232), and fire-gilding with mercury dates to at least the 4th century BC, and was the most common method until the Early Modern period at least, though dangerous for the workers and often caused blindness among French artisans who refined the technique in the 18th century. Today electroplating is the most commonly used method: it involves no mercury and is therefore much safer.  Keum-boo is a special Korean technique of silver-gilding, using depletion gilding.  In China gilt-bronze, also known as ormolu, was more common.

Vermeil

Vermeil ( or) is an alternative for the usual term silver-gilt.   It is a French word which came into use in the English language, mostly in America, in the 19th century, and is rare in British English.  "Vermeil" can also refer to gilt bronze, an even less costly alternative construction material than silver.

Considerations in use

Silver objects could be gilded at any point, not just when first made, and items regularly handled, such as toilet service sets for dressing-tables or tableware, often needed regilding after a few years, as the gold began to wear off.  In 18th century London two different silversmiths charged 3 shillings per ounce of silver for an initial gilding, and 1 shilling and 9 pence per ounce for regilding. Often only the interior of cups was gilded, perhaps from concern at the chemical compounds used to clean tarnish from silver.  This is called parcel-gilt.

Fully silver-gilt items are visually indistinguishable from gold, and were no doubt often thought to be solid gold.  When the English Commonwealth sold the Crown Jewels of England after the execution of Charles I they were disappointed in the medieval "Queen Edith's Crowne, formerly thought to be of massy gold, but upon trial found to be of silver gilt", which was valued at only £16, compared to £1,110 for the "imperial crowne".  The English Gothic Revival architect Sir George Gilbert Scott was concerned by the morality of this. Gilding of the interior only he accepted, but with all-over gilding "we ... reach the actual boundary of truth and falsehood; and I am convinced that if we adopt this custom we overstep it.... why make our gift look more costly than it is?  We increase its beauty, but it is at the sacrifice of truth." Indeed, some Early Medieval silver-gilt Celtic brooches had compartments apparently for small lead weights to aid such deception.

See also
 :Category:Silver-gilt objects
 Vermeil Room, in which the White House's extensive collection is displayed

Citations

General and cited references 
 Inventory of the goods, jewels, etc., sold by order of the Council of State from the several places and palaces following:--The Tower Jewel-Houses, Somerset House, Whitehall, Greenwich, Wimbledon, Oatlands, Windsor, Hampton Court, Richmond, Sion House, St. James's, and several other places; with the several contracts made by the contractors for sale of the said goods, etc., from the year 1646 to the year 1652. British Library, Harleian Ms. Article
 Glanville, Philippa. Silver in England, Taylor & Francis, 2006, 
 Koopman Rare Art. Gilt-edged Splendour: Masterpieces in Silver Gilt, with photographs by Guy Hills, John Adamson, 2013,  
 Scott, Sir George Gilbert, Remarks on secular & domestic architecture, present & future, John Murray, 1857. Google books
 Strong, Donald Emrys. Greek and Roman Gold and Silver Plate, Taylor & Francis, 1979, 

Gilding
Gold
Metal plating
Silversmithing